Shehua (Shēhuà, meaning 'She speech') is an unclassified Sinitic language spoken by the She people of Southeastern China. It is also called Shanha, San-hak or Shanhahua. Shehua speakers are located mainly in Fujian and Zhejiang provinces of Southeastern China, with smaller numbers of speakers in a few locations of Jiangxi (in Guixi and Yanshan County), Guangdong (in Chaozhou and Fengshun County) and Anhui (in Ningguo) provinces.

Shēhuà is not to be confused with Shēyǔ (also known as Ho Ne), which is a Hmong–Mien language spoken in East-Central Guangdong. Shehua and Sheyu speakers have separate histories and identities, although both are officially classified by the Chinese government as She people. The Dongjia of Majiang County, Guizhou are also officially classified as She people, but speak a Western Hmongic language closely related to Chong'anjiang Miao.

History
During the Tang dynasty, Shehua speakers lived in the Jiangxi-Guangdong-Fujian border region. Afterwards, they moved to their present locations further to the northeast.

Classification
Some linguists consider Shehua to be a variety of Hakka Chinese, while others consider it to be an unclassified variety of Chinese that has received some influence from Hakka and is not part of Hakka. Hiroki Nakanishi (2010) considers Shehua to be a Hakka dialect that may have a Sheyu (Hmongic) substratum. However, Zhao (2004) considers Shehua to be an independent branch of Chinese, and that it should not be classified within Hakka.

Depending on their locations, Shehua dialects have been variously influenced by Hakka, Gan, Wu, and Min.

Dialects
You (2002:31-35) divides Shehua into 9 dialectal areas (fangyan qu 方言区), and with respective locations and speaker demographics from You (2002) listed as well. The Eastern Fujian and Southern Zhejiang dialectal areas each have over 100,000 speakers, while the smallest dialectal areas are in Guangdong and Jiangxi, with each having only a few thousand speakers. Altogether, there are more than 400,000 Shehua speakers in China.
Mindong (Eastern Fujian), spoken in the counties of Fu'an 福安, Fuding 福鼎, Xiapu 霞浦, Ningde 宁德, Shouning 寿宁, Zhouning 周宁, Zherong 柘荣, Pingnan 屏南, Luoyuan 罗源, Lianjiang 连江, Fuzhou 福州郊区, Minhou 闽侯, Minqing 闽清, and Yongqin 永泰. 184,000 speakers. In contact with Eastern Min.
Minbei (Northern Fujian), spoken in the counties of Nanping 南平, Jian'ou 建瓯, Jianyang 建阳, Shaowu 邵武, Shunchang 顺昌, and Guangze 光泽. 21,000 speakers. In contact with Northern Min.
Minzhong (Central Fujian), spoken in the counties of Sanming 三明, Yong'an 永安, Shaxian 沙县, and Ninghua 宁化. Also spoken in Shuangguishan 双贵山, Youxi County, Fujian. 12,000 speakers. In contact with Central Min.
Minnan (Southern Fujian), spoken in the counties of Licheng District 鲤城区 (in Quanzhou), Anxi 安溪, Dehua 德化, Yongchun 永春, Hua'an 华安, Longyan 龙岩, and Zhangping 漳平. 12,000 speakers. In contact with Southern Min. In Zhangping City, Shanyangge Shehua 山羊隔畲话 is spoken by over 800 people in the two villages of Shanyangge 山羊隔, Guilin Township 桂林乡, and Jianci 尖祠, Xi'nan Township 溪南乡. Shanyangge Shehua is distinct from Shejiake 畲家客, which is a Southern Min dialect spoken by over 100 people in Zhangping County in the two villages of Changta Village 长塔村, Xianghu Township 象湖乡 and Wei Village 尾村, Shuangyang Township 双洋乡.
Zhenan (Southern Zhejiang), spoken in the counties of Pingyang 平阳, Cangnan 苍南, Rui'an 瑞安, Wencheng 文成, Taishun 泰顺, Lishui 丽水, Jingning 景宁, Yunhe 云和, Longquan 龙泉, Songyang 松阳, Qingtian 青田, and Wuyi 武义. 120,000 speakers. In contact with Wu Chinese.
Zhezhong (Central Zhejiang), spoken in the counties of Longyou 龙游, Quxian 衢县, Lanxi 兰溪, Jinhua 金华, and Suichang 遂昌. 23,000 speakers. In contact with Wu Chinese.
Zhebei (Northern Zhejiang), spoken in the counties of Tonglu 桐庐, Jiande 建德, Lin'an 临安, Fuyang 富阳, and Anji 安吉. 13,000 speakers. In contact with Wu Chinese.
Yuedong (Eastern Guangdong), spoken in the counties of Chaozhou 潮州 and Fengshun 丰顺. 2,200 speakers. In contact with the Teochew dialect of Southern Min. In Fengshun County, it is spoken in Fengping Village 凤坪村, Tanjiang Town 潭江镇. You, Lei & Lan (2005) document the Shehua variety of Fenghuangshan 凤凰山 ("Phoenix Mountain") in eastern Guangdong.
Gandong (Eastern Jiangxi), spoken in the counties of Guixi 贵溪 and Yanshan 铅山. 4,000 speakers. In contact with Gan Chinese. The Shehua variety of Taiyuan 太源畲族乡, Yanshan County, Jiangxi has been documented in detail by Hu & Hu (2013), while the Shehua variety of Zhangping Township 樟坪畲族乡, Guixi City, Jiangxi has been documented in detail by Liu (2008).

In Anhui Province, there is also a Shehua dialect spoken by about 2,400 people in Yunti She Ethnic Township, Ningguo City that has been influenced by Lower Yangtze Mandarin.

You (2002) provides a comparative vocabulary list for the following 13 datapoints. The Zhebei dialectal area 浙北方言区 has not been included by You (2002).
Fu'an 福安, Ningde, Fujian (Mindong dialectal area 闽东方言区)
Fuding 福鼎, Ningde, Fujian (Mindong dialectal area 闽东方言区; includes Xiamen She Ethnic Township 硖门畲族乡)
Luoyuan 罗源, Fuzhou, Fujian (Mindong dialectal area 闽东方言区)
Sanming 三明, Fujian (Minzhong dialectal area 闽中方言区)
Shunchang 顺昌, Nanping 南平, Fujian (Minbei dialectal area 闽北方言区)
Hua'an 华安, Zhangzhou 华安, southern Fujian (Minnan dialectal area 闽北方言区)
Guixi 贵溪, Yingtan 鹰潭, Jiangxi (Gandong dialectal area 赣东方言区)
Cangnan 苍南, Wenzhou 温州, Zhejiang (Zhe'nan dialectal area 浙南方言区)
Jingning 景宁, Lishui 丽水, Zhejiang (Zhe'nan dialectal area 浙南方言区)
Lishui 丽水, Zhejiang (Zhe'nan dialectal area 浙南方言区)
Longyou 龙游, Quzhou 衢州, Zhejiang (Zhezhong dialectal area 浙中方言区; includes Muchen She Ethnic Township 沐尘畲族乡)
Chaozhou 潮州, Guangdong (Yuedong dialectal area 粤东方言区)
Fengshun 丰顺, Meizhou 梅州, Guangdong (Yuedong dialectal area 粤东方言区)

Distribution
The following maps show ethnic She townships and other administrative divisions (highlighted in magenta) in Zhejiang, Fujian, and Jiangxi provinces. The She people of these three provinces speak Shehua, while the She of central Guangdong and Guizhou speak Hmongic languages.

The most Shehua speakers are located in Ningde Prefecture, Fujian, and Wenzhou and Lishui Prefectures, Zhejiang. Smaller communities of Shehua speakers are located in central Zhejiang, southern Fujian, the mountainous interior of western Fujian, southeastern Anhui, eastern Guangdong and northeastern Jiangxi near its border with Fujian. It is not known whether Shehua is spoken by She people living in central and southern Jiangxi.

Phonology
Like many Hakka dialects, most Shehua dialects have the final stop consonants -p, -t, and -k. Some varieties of the Mindong Shehua dialect (including the Fu'an and Fuding varieties) have the initial voiceless lateral fricative ɬ- where other Shehua dialects have an initial s-.

Shehua has 6 phonemic contour tones, which can be organized into the following 6 tone categories (You 2002:80-83).

Tone category 1: dark level 阴平 (historically voiceless)
Tone category 2: light level 阳平 (historically voiced)
Tone category 3: rising 上声 (historically tense or checked)
Tone category 6: departing 去声 (historically breathy)
Tone category 7: dark entering 阴入 (historically voiceless)
Tone category 8: light entering 阳入 (historically voiced)

Lexicon

Unique vocabulary
You (2002:183-216) notes that Shehua has many unique vocabulary items that have no cognates in Hakka, Gan, Wu, or any other Chinese language. Instead, many words have parallels in Hmong-Mien languages (You 2002:490-504), and in Tai and Kam-Sui languages (You 2002:458-489). Other words appear to have no parallels in any other language family or branch (You 2002:505-518).

Swadesh list
Below is a vocabulary table comparing Swadesh lists of Shehua (Fengshun), Hakka (Boluo), and She (Boluo), from Gan (2011:188-191).

Further reading
Liu Lunxin 刘纶鑫. 2008. Guixi Zhangping Shehua yanjiu 贵溪樟坪畲话研究. Beijing: China Social Sciences Academy Press 中国社会科学出版社.
Zhao Zeling 赵则玲. 2004. Zhejiang Shehua yanjiu 浙江畲话硏究. Hangzhou: Zhejiang People's Press 浙江人民出版社.
Wu Chong-chieh 吳中杰. 2004. Languages of She Minority / Shezu yuyan yanjiu 畬族語言研究. Ph.D. dissertation. Hsinchu, Taiwan: National Tsing Hua University 國立清華大學語言研究所.
Chang Kuang-yu 張光宇. 2008. Guangdong Chao'an Shehua diaocha yanjiu 廣東潮安畬話調查研究. Hsinchu, Taiwan: National Tsing Hua University 國立清華大學語言研究所.
Fujian Provincial Gazetteer 福建省志 方言志. Appendix: The Fujian She language 附：福建畲语.
曹志耘. 2002. 南部吴语语音研究. 北京: 商务印书馆. 2002年9月. 
傅国通. 2010. 方言丛稿. 北京: 中华书局. 2010年9月.  （繁体中文）
Luo Meizhen 罗美珍. 1980. Shezu suo shuo de Kejiahua 畲族所说的客家话. In 中央民族学院学报 1980年01期.
傅根清. 2003. 从景宁畲话的语音特点论其与客家话的关系. 山东大学学报, 2003, (5).
Deng, Xiaohua 邓晓华. 1999. Kejiahua gen Miao-yao Zhuangdongyu de Guanxi wenti 客家话跟苗瑶壮侗语的关系问题. Minzu Yuwen 民族语文 3:42-49.
Hsiu, Andrew. 2018. The origins of Shehua. Archive.org : https://web.archive.org/web/20190420131003/https://sites.google.com/site/msealangs/home/blog/shehua

Notes

References

Citations

Sources 

 Nakanishi Hiroki 中西裕树. 2010. On the genetic affiliation of Shehua 《论畬话的归属》. Journal of Chinese Linguistics Monograph Series, no. 24 (2010): 247-67. https://www.jstor.org/stable/23825447
 Hu Songbai 胡松柏; Hu Derong 胡德荣. 2013. Yanshan Taiyuan Shehua yanjiu 《铅山太源畲话研究》. Beijing: China Social Sciences Academy Press 中国社会科学出版社.
 You Wenliang 游文良. 2002. Shezu yuyan 《畲族语言》. Fuzhou: Fujian People's Press 福建人民出版社. 

Varieties of Chinese
Sino-Tibetan languages
Fujian
Zhejiang
She people